Looking Through is the third studio album by English gothic rock band The Danse Society under the name The Danse Society International. It was released in 1986, through the band's own record label, Society. AllMusic described the album as "a collection of demos". Looking Through was the band's final album until 2011's Change of Skin.

Track listing

Critical reception 

Along with the rest of the band's work, Trouser Press panned the album, calling it "more tedious and repetitive new wave disco for the doomy haircut-and-mascara brigade. Lacking any striking material, this is functional genre fare for yesterday's club kids."

Personnel 

 Paul Gilmartin – drums, production
 Paul Nash – guitar, production
 Steve Rawlings – vocals, production
 David Whitaker – keyboards, production
 Tim Wright – bass guitar, production

References

External links 

 

1986 albums
The Danse Society albums